Surgical scissors are scissors specially manufactured as surgical instruments, typically used for cutting sutures, dressings, and cutting and dissecting biological tissue. Surgical scissors are usually made of surgical steel. Some have tungsten carbide reinforcements along their cutting edges, the hardness of which allows manufacturers to create sharper and more durable edges.

Mechanical types of scissors 
There are two main mechanical types of scissors used in surgery:
 Ring scissors, which look and function much like standard utility scissors with ring finger loops
 Spring forceps are small scissors used mostly in eye surgery or microsurgery. The handles end in flat springs connected with a pivot joint. The cutting action is achieved by pressing the handles together. As the pressure is released, the spring action opens the jaws.

Scissors are available in various configurations like
 Blunt/blunt blades
 Blunt/sharp blades
 Sharp/sharp blades

Examples 
Some examples of surgical scissors include:

 Bandage scissors
 Dissecting scissors
 Iris scissors
 Suture scissors
 Tenotomy scissors
 Metzenbaum scissors
 Plastic surgery (facelift) scissors
 Mayo scissors

Gallery

See also
Trauma shears
Bandage scissors
Hemostat, a surgical clamp resembling scissors
Needle holder, an instrument resembling scissors used to hold a suturing needle

References

External links
 

 
Scissors
Surgical instruments